The 1999 Eurotel Slovak Indoor was a women's tennis tournament played on indoor hard courts at the Sibamac Arena in Bratislava, Slovakia that was part of the Tier IV category of the 1999 WTA Tour. It was the inaugural edition of the tournament and was held from 18 October until 24 October 1999. First-seeded Amélie Mauresmo won the singles title and earned $16,000 first-prize money.

Entrants

Seeds

Other entrants
The following players received wildcards into the singles main draw:
  Ľudmila Cervanová
  Daniela Hantuchová

The following players received wildcards into the doubles main draw:
  Ľudmila Cervanová /  Daniela Hantuchová

The following players received entry from the singles qualifying draw:

  Renata Kučerová
  Radka Pelikánová
  Sandra Kleinová
  Katalin Marosi

The following players received entry from the doubles qualifying draw:
  Stanislava Hrozenská /  Andrea Šebová

Finals

Singles

 Amélie Mauresmo defeated  Kim Clijsters, 6–3, 6–3
 This was Mauresmo's first WTA singles title of her career.

Doubles

 Kim Clijsters /  Laurence Courtois defeated  Olga Barabanschikova /  Lilia Osterloh, 6–2, 3–6, 7–5

References

External links
 ITF tournament edition details
 Tournament draws

Eurotel Slovak Open
1999 in Slovak women's sport
1999 in Slovak tennis